Federico Alfredo Cristóforo Pepe (born 19 September 1989) is a Uruguayan footballer who plays as a goalkeeper for Ameliano.

Career

Cristóforo started his career with Uruguayan second tier side Huracán (Paso de la Arena). Before the 2013 season, Cristóforo signed for Wanderers in the Uruguayan top flight, where he made 92 league appearances and scored 0 goals. On 5 February 2017, he debuted for Wanderers during a 0–0 draw with Danubio. Before the second half of 2014–15, Cristóforo was sent on loan to Mexican second tier club Necaxa (Mexico). In 2016, he signed for Deportivo Maldonado in the Uruguayan second tier. 

Before the 2017 season, he signed for Uruguayan top flight team Danubio. Before the 2020 season, Cristóforo signed for Villa Teresa in the Uruguayan second tier. Before the 2021 season, he signed for Manta in the Ecuadorian top flight. Before the 2022 season, he signed for Paraguayan outfit Ameliano, helping them win the 2022 Copa Paraguay, their first major trophy.

Personal life

Cristóforo is the older brother of former Italian Serie A and Spanish La Liga player Sebastián Cristóforo.

References

External links

 

1989 births
Association football goalkeepers
Expatriate footballers in Ecuador
Expatriate footballers in Mexico
Expatriate footballers in Paraguay
Living people
Uruguayan expatriate footballers
Uruguayan expatriate sportspeople in Ecuador
Uruguayan expatriate sportspeople in Mexico
Uruguayan expatriate sportspeople in Paraguay
Uruguayan footballers